John Henry Shirley (1902–1968) was a footballer who played in the Football League for Stoke City.

Career
Shirley was born in Crewe and began his career with non-league Whitchurch before joining league Stoke City in 1927. He made a fine start scoring twice on his debut against Fulham in November 1927. However, despite that he never was considered to be a regular in the Stoke side by manager Tom Mather and he spent three seasons at the Victoria Ground making 31 appearances scoring 11 goals. He went on to play for non-league sides Hednesford Town and Macclesfield Town.

Career statistics

References

1902 births
1968 deaths
Sportspeople from Crewe
Association football forwards
English footballers
Whitchurch F.C. players
Stoke City F.C. players
Hednesford Town F.C. players
Macclesfield Town F.C. players
English Football League players